Derrick Michael Phelps (born July 31, 1972) is an American former professional basketball player. At 6'4" and 181 lbs., he played as a point guard. He was most recently the associate head coach at Washington State.

High school
Phelps attended Christ The King Regional High School, in Middle Village, Queens, New York. He was named to the 1990 McDonald's All-American Team. After, he played in the McDonald's All-American game with future UNC teammates Eric Montross, Brian Reese, and Clifford Rozier.

College career
Phelps rose to prominence while playing college basketball for coach Dean Smith at the University of North Carolina, with the Tar Heels. He was named as an All-Atlantic Coast Conference Honorable Mention in 1993, and was named to the 2nd Team in 1994. Phelps was a member of North Carolina's 1993 NCAA National Championship team, as the Tar Heels defeated Michigan, by a score of 77-71, in the title game. Graduating in 1994, Phelps left college holding two Tar Heel records: most steals in one game (9), and most steals in a career (247). He was also the only player in ACC history with 600 assists, 400 rebounds, and 200 steals.

Professional playing career
Phelps was not drafted by an NBA team. He was the sixth overall pick of the 1994 Continental Basketball Association (CBA) draft, by the Chicago Rockers. He did play in three NBA games with the Sacramento Kings in the 1994-95 season. The Vancouver Grizzlies selected him in the 1995 NBA expansion draft, but he did not play for them before they renounced his NBA rights in 1996. He also spent some time during the NBA preseason (but not in any regular season contests) with the Milwaukee Bucks (1994), and Philadelphia 76ers (1997).

In 1996, Phelps signed with the German team TTL uniVersa Bamberg, before playing for the CBA's Rockford Lightning.
 
From 2000–02, he played with the German club ALBA Berlin, with former UNC teammate Henrik Rödl (having already played with the German club Telekom Baskets Bonn in 1998–2000). He then played in France with CSP Limoges, then returned to Germany, and had a brief stint in 2004, with Śląsk Wrocław in the Polish League.

Phelps also played in the Netherlands, in Germany with GHP Bamberg, and in the Russian Super League with Spartak Primorie Vladivostok.

In the 2009-10 season, he played with Gaz Metan Medias in the Romanian League.

Coaching career
In October 2010, Phelps was named the video coordinator for Fordham University's men's basketball team.  In 2011, he joined the Monmouth University staff as an assistant coach. Prior to the start of the 2014 season, he accepted a position as an assistant coach at Columbia University.  He served for three seasons as the associate head coach at San Francisco, before following Kyle Smith to Washington State after the 2018-19 season. He stepped down from the position in June 2022.

References

External links 
Monmouth coaching biography
NBA stats at BasketballReference

1972 births
Living people
African-American basketball players
Alba Berlin players
American expatriate basketball people in France
American expatriate basketball people in Germany
American expatriate basketball people in the Netherlands
American expatriate basketball people in Poland
American expatriate basketball people in Romania
American expatriate basketball people in Russia
American men's basketball players
Basketball players from New York City
BC Spartak Primorye players
Brose Bamberg players
Chicago Rockers players
Columbia Lions men's basketball coaches
Heroes Den Bosch players
La Crosse Bobcats players
Limoges CSP players
McDonald's High School All-Americans
Monmouth Hawks men's basketball coaches
North Carolina Tar Heels men's basketball players
Parade High School All-Americans (boys' basketball)
Point guards
Riesen Ludwigsburg players
Sacramento Kings players
San Francisco Dons men's basketball coaches
Śląsk Wrocław basketball players
Sportspeople from Queens, New York
Telekom Baskets Bonn players
Undrafted National Basketball Association players
Vancouver Grizzlies expansion draft picks
Washington State Cougars men's basketball coaches
21st-century African-American sportspeople
20th-century African-American sportspeople